The Davos University Conferences were a project between 1928 and 1931 to create an international university at Davos in Switzerland.

Origins 
The Davos University Conferences owed their creation to two complementary initiatives, one local and one international.

Local initiative 
 Noting the large number of tubercular students who came to Davos, as a mountain town known for its cosmopolitan atmosphere and as a luxurious place to convalesce, between 1926 and 1927 a committee was formed by the local doctors to formulate a diversification project for Davos University.

International initiative 
The Davos project coincided with warming international relations, particularly between France and the Weimar Republic (Germany) after the Locarno Pact of 1925. German intellectuals who wanted to participate in international academic conferences approached the Davos initiators and redefined their university project to become an annual conference.

Organisation 
A committee made up of local and visiting academics was assembled under the chairmanship of Dr Paul Müller (instigator of the Spengler coup in 1923), the sociologist Gottfried Salomon (1892 – 1964), president of the Frankfurt DFG, and Erhard Branger (1881 – 1958), mayor of Davos, who made it their mission to invite élite European intellectuals to Davos for weeks of work and exchange of ideas. The committee was augmented in 1929 by three national committees (German, French and Swiss).

Establishment 
For four consecutive years, between 1928 and 1931, the committee convened a large number of important intellectuals, mainly German and French, for conferences (in both languages) lasting three weeks at the end of winter.

Conferences

1928 

The first Conference was opened by Erhard Branger (mayor of Davos), Lucien Lévy-Bruhl (French philosopher and sociologist), Hans Driesch (German philosopher) and Albert Einstein.

Presenters

1929 

The second conference was opened by Giuseppe Motta (Federal Council). It was noted for the "Cassirer–Heidegger debate" between Martin Heidegger and Ernst Cassirer.

Presenters

Students

1930 
The third conference was opened by Federal Councillor Heinrich Häberlin. It was the first conference to be conducted partly in English.

Presenters

1931

Presenters 
 The fourth conference was opened by Carl Heinrich Becker (lately the Prussian Minister of Culture).

Disestablishment 
The 1932 conference could not be held because of the Great Depression. Adolf Hitler's ascension and granting of absolute power on 30 January 1933, led to the exile of many German intellectuals and put an end to Franco-German co-operation in science, which made it impossible to continue the conferences.

See also 
 Conference on the Epistemology of the Exact Sciences

References

Notes

Further reading
  139 p. (PDF)
  pp. 246–253 (PDF)

Higher education in Switzerland
1927 establishments in Switzerland
Davos
Educational institutions established in 1927
Educational institutions disestablished in 1931